is the thirty-second single of the J-pop group Morning Musume. It was released on February 14, 2007. It was at first rumored to be the last single to feature Hitomi Yoshizawa (leader until May 6, 2007) but this was disproved. It is the first for the eighth generation Aika Mitsui.

There are three different versions of the single. Limited edition A includes a bonus DVD and has catalog number EPCE-5450~1. Limited edition B comes in a special package with a 32-page photo booklet and has catalog number EPCE-5452. The regular edition has catalog number EPCE-5453, and the first press of this edition has a photo card included.

The Single V was released on March 7, 2007, and the limited edition included a photocard of Mitsui.

The total sales of the CD single were 53,047, which peaked at number four on the Oricon Charts.

Details 
 This is the first single of Aika Mitsui, making the total member count nine people.
 The song's first appearance on TV was Utaban on February 8, 2007.
 "Sayonara no Kawari ni" is the first cover song since "Morning Musume no Hyokkori Hyōtanjima", and it was also the opening song for the mini-drama Arigatō o Tsutaetai (broadcast on Oha Suta).
 The jacket represents the B-side.
 The packaging resembled the packaging used for Bokura ga Ikiru My Asia.
 The name refers to a naked smile/an honest face, or as known in Japanese, .

Track listings

CD 

  
  
  "Egao Yes Nude (instrumental)"

DVD 

 "Egao Yes Nude"
 "Egao Yes Nude (Dance Shot Ver.)"

Members at time of single 
 4th generation: Hitomi Yoshizawa
 5th generation: Ai Takahashi, Risa Niigaki
 6th generation: Miki Fujimoto, Eri Kamei, Sayumi Michishige, Reina Tanaka
 7th generation: Koharu Kusumi
 8th generation : Aika Mitsui

Personnel 
Hitomi Yoshizawa – main vocals
Ai Takahashi – main vocals
Risa Niigaki – main vocals
Miki Fujimoto – main vocals
Eri Kamei – minor vocals
Sayumi Michishige – minor vocals
Reina Tanaka – center vocals
Koharu Kusumi – center vocals
Aika Mitsui – center vocals
Koichi Korenaga – guitar
Hiroshi Matsui – programming & keyboard
Hiroaki Takeuchi – backing vocals (chorus)
Tsunku – backing vocals (chorus)

References

External links 
 Egao Yes Nude entries on the Up-Front Works official website: CD, DVD

Morning Musume songs
Zetima Records singles
2007 singles
Song recordings produced by Tsunku
2007 songs
Dance-pop songs